Sleep No More is the fifth studio album released by English-Italian singer-songwriter Jack Savoretti, released on 28 October 2016.The album has peaked at number 6 on the UK Albums Chart and has sold 100,000 copies as of September 2017.

Track listing

Charts

References

Jack Savoretti albums
2016 albums
Albums produced by Samuel Dixon
Albums produced by Cam Blackwood
Albums produced by Steve Robson